Sawley is a civil parish in the Borough of Erewash in Derbyshire, England. The parish contains eight listed buildings that are recorded in the National Heritage List for England.  Of these, one is listed at Grade I, the highest of the three grades, and the others are at Grade II, the lowest grade. The parish contains the village of Sawley and the surrounding area. The listed buildings consist of two railway bridges, two parts of a road bridge, a church and its rectory, a chapel, and a house.


Key

Buildings

References

Citations

Sources

 

Lists of listed buildings in Derbyshire